Scott Fraser may refer to:

 Scott Fraser (footballer, born 1963), retired Scottish midfielder for Dundee
 Scott Fraser (footballer, born 1995), Scottish footballer for Ipswich Town
 Scott Fraser (ice hockey) (born 1972), retired ice hockey player
 Scott Fraser (politician), Canadian politician
 Scott E. Fraser, American biophysicist
 Scott Fraser (diplomat), Canadian ambassador to Finland
 Scott Fraser (orienteer) (born 1986), British orienteer
 Scott Fraser (racing driver) (1970–2004), Canadian racecar driver